Tadas Duškinas (born 27 April 1994) is a Lithuanian swimmer. He competed in the men's 50 metre butterfly event at the 2017 World Aquatics Championships. In 2019, he represented Lithuania at the 2019 World Aquatics Championships held in Gwangju, South Korea.

References

External links
 

1994 births
Living people
Lithuanian male butterfly swimmers
Place of birth missing (living people)